The Chaser Annual is a printed compendium of stories from The Chaser, published yearly since 2000. The book typically features a collection of the best headlines from The Chaser's website over the preceding year, presented in the style of their defunct print newspaper.  Originally published as part of The Chaser's newspaper's business, the Annual continued despite the closure of the newspaper in 2005, with editions continuing to be released through to 2010.

The Annual was revived in 2016 as part of the Chaser's Quarterly Journal series in conjunction with Australian satirical website The Shovel. Since 2017 the Annual has returned to its original form, and is now sold alongside a national stage tour 'The War on The Year'. The show has sold out yearly across Australia since 2016, and has included performances at The Sydney Opera House, and a TV adaptation is in development for 2020.

Editions 

As of 2009, The Chaser have produced ten annuals.

References

Publications established in 2000
The Chaser
Text Publishing books